Qismat Apnay Haat Mein is the sixth album produced by Shehzad Roy, with the title song named as Qismat Apnay Haat Mein, Shehzad Roy's sixth album, released on July 25, 2008 on Fire Records.

Track listing
Aankhien - Violoncello Version
Baro Chal- Tribute To Mayee Bhaagi(Lady Fortunate)
Darwaaza 
Ek Bar 
Jaane Kahaan 
Khul Ke Pyaar 
Laga Reh 
Qismat Apnay Haat Mein 
Quaid-e-Azam 
Zindagi - Feat [Abida Parveen]

External links
 Shehzad Roy's Official website
  Roy's loud and clear political message clicks - The Nation

2008 albums
Shehzad Roy albums